Obia is a monotypic genus of planthopper in the family Fulgoridae, presently comprising a single species Obia tenebrosa, known from Mexico.

References

Auchenorrhyncha genera
Poiocerinae
Monotypic Hemiptera genera
Insects of Mexico